Blin may refer to the following:

Food

 Russian pancakes, called Blin or (plural) blini.

People 
 Adrien-Michel-Hyacinthe Blin de Sainmore (1733-1807), French poet, playwright and historian
 Anne-Laure Blin (born 1983), French politician
 Arnaud Blin (1960-), French historian and political scientist

 Édouard-Pierre Blin (1877-1946), French medallic artist in engraving

 François-Pierre Blin (1756-1834), French physician, député aux États généraux de 1789

 Joseph Blin (1764-1834), French politician, father-in-law of François Désiré Roulin

 Marlène Blin (1975-), French journalist with France 3
 Mathieu Blin (1977-), French rugby player
 Maurice Blin (1922-2016), a senator from Ardennes, France
 Roger Blin (1907-1984), French actor
 Blin (footballer) (born 1979), Spanish footballer

Places 
 Montaigu-le-Blin, commune in the Allier department, France
 Saint-Blin, commune in the Haute-Marne department, France

Peoples 
 Bilen people (or, Blin or Bilin), an ethnic group of Eritrea
 Blin language, spoken by the Bilen people

See also 
 Bilin (disambiguation)